Yamaguchi may refer to:

People
Yamaguchi (surname), the 14th most popular Japanese surname.

Places
Yamaguchi Prefecture, the westernmost prefecture of Honshū island of Japan
Yamaguchi (city), capital of Yamaguchi Prefecture
Yamaguchi Station (Yamaguchi), a JR West railway station, located in the center of Yamaguchi-shi
Shin-Yamaguchi Station, a railway station in Yamaguchi-shi (Sanyō Shinkansen line)
Yamaguchi, Nagano, a village in Nagano Prefecture

Fiction
Kumiko "Yankumi" Yamaguchi, the character played by Yukie Nakama in Gokusen, a Japanese TV show
Yamaguchi-sensei, a doctor in the manga/anime series Fighting Spirit
U.S.S. Yamaguchi, an Ambassador Class Federation starship in the Star Trek franchise
Yamaguchi Digital Pets, a fictional digital pets company mentioned in Fanboy & Chum Chum
Yamaguchi Tadashi, a member of the Karasuno volleyball club in the manga/anime series Haikyu!!

People
 Kristi Yamaguchi, American figure skater
 Otoya Yamaguchi, Japanese political assassin

Other uses
 Yamaguchi Bank, a major regional bank in Japan, primarily in the Yamaguchi prefecture
 Yamaguchi Bicycles, a custom bike frame builder in Rifle, Colorado
 Yamaguchi Broadcasting (later named KRY), a Japanese television and radio broadcasting company
 Yamaguchi Dam (China), a dam in northwest China
 Yamaguchi Dam (Nagano), a dam in Nagano Prefecture, Japan
 Yamaguchi Prefectural University
 Yamaguchi Ube Airport
 Yamaguchi University
 Yamaguchi-gumi, a yakuza group
 15841 Yamaguchi, an asteroid named for the Japanese prefecture
 Sweden v. Yamaguchi
 Yamaguchi esterification, a chemical reaction